Carmen Brussig (born 20 May 1977) is a German judoka who has won numerous tournaments including Paralympic and world championship gold.

Brussig was born in Leipzig with visual impairments and competes in B2 classification events. She made her Paralympic debut at the 2008 Summer Paralympics in Beijing, winning a bronze medal in the under 48 kg weight class. She lost in the quarterfinal to Russian judoka Victoria Potapova but won the repechage against Cuban Maria Gonzalez to claim the bronze. Four years later, in the London Games, Brussig claimed gold by beating Potapova in the quarterfinal and Yuliya Halinska in the semifinal. This put Brussig into the final for the first time where she faced and defeated Lee Kai Lin. When defending her title at the 2016 Games in Rio de Janeiro she won the semifinal against Halinska but then lost in the final to world champion Li Liqing, earning herself a silver medal.

Brussig's judoka career outside the Paralympic Games has also seen her achieve great successes. She has won eight international tournaments between 2001 and 2014, along with six silver and three bronze medals. Brussig lives in Switzerland and competes in national Swiss tournaments, finishing in the top three eight times between 2005 and 2014. In 2015 she won the world championship in her weight category for the third time, having achieved the same feat in 2006 and 2007.

Brussig is 15 minutes older than her identical twin sister, Ramona Brussig, also a medal-winning judoka. The pair won Paralympic gold within 15 minutes of each other in London 2012, with Ramona competing in the heavier under 52 weight category. Both sisters are listed amongst the most promising German medal candidates for the 2020 Summer Paralympics in Tokyo, resulting in them being given financial support in their endeavours.

Brussig trained as a pastry chef until her visual impairments stopped her from continuing with that career.

Competitive results
:
Paralympic Games
2008 – 3rd place
2012 – 1st place
2016 – 2nd place

World Championships
2006 – 1st place singles and team
2007 – 1st place singles and team
2010 – 3rd place 
2011 – 2nd place
2014 – 2nd place
2015 – 1st place

European Championships
2007 – 1st place singles and team
2009 – 3rd place team
2009 – 2nd place
2011 – 3rd place 
2013 – 2nd place
2015 – 2nd place

German championships
2005 – 2nd place
2006 – 1st place 
2007 – 1st place 
2008 – 1st place 
2009 – 1st place 
2010 – 1st place 
2011 – 1st place 
2012 – 2nd place 
2013 – 1st place 
2014 – 1st place 
2017 – 1st place

Swiss championships
2005 – 1st place
2006 – 2nd place 
2007 – 3rd place 
2008 – 3rd place 
2009 – 2nd place 
2010 – 5th place 
2012 – 2nd place 
2013 – 3rd place 
2014 – 3rd place

References

External links
 
 
 

1977 births
Living people
German female judoka
Judoka at the 2008 Summer Paralympics
Judoka at the 2012 Summer Paralympics
Judoka at the 2016 Summer Paralympics
Paralympic gold medalists for Germany
Medalists at the 2008 Summer Paralympics
Medalists at the 2012 Summer Paralympics
Medalists at the 2016 Summer Paralympics
Paralympic medalists in judo
Paralympic judoka of Germany
Sportspeople from Leipzig